The false cat-eyed snake (Pseudoleptodeira latifasciata) is a genus of snake in the family Colubridae.

It is endemic to Mexico.

References 

Colubrids
Reptiles described in 1894
Reptiles of Mexico
Taxa named by Albert Günther